William J. Shaw is the (retired, 2011) Vice-Chairman of Marriott International Inc. He has held this post since May 2009. Shaw received his BA from University of Notre Dame and  MBA from Washington University in St. Louis in 1972. He joined the Marriott hotel company in 1974, was elected Corporate Controller in 1979, and a company Vice President in 1982. In 1986, Shaw became Senior Vice President of Finance and Treasurer of Marriott Corporation. He was elected Chief Financial Officer and Executive Vice President of Marriott Corporation in April 1988. In February 1992, he was elected President of the Marriott Service Group. Between March 1997 and April 2009, Shaw served as the President and Chief Operating Officer of Marriott International, before taking up his current position as Vice-Chairman.

Shaw is on the board of trustees of the University of Notre Dame, the Suburban Hospital Foundation, the Wolf Trap Foundation of the Performing Arts, Washington Mutual Investor Fund, board of directors and the NCAA Leadership Advisory Board. Mr. Shaw has been a director of Marriott International, or its predecessors, since 1997, and is currently serving a term expiring at the 2008 annual meeting of shareholders. 
Shaw is now the Chairman of the Board since November 2011 for Marriott Vacations Worldwide.

References

Olin Business School (Washington University) alumni
University of Notre Dame alumni
American hoteliers
Living people
American chief financial officers
American chief operating officers
Year of birth missing (living people)